Jeffrey Langdon (born August 13, 1975) is a Canadian former competitive figure skater. He is a two-time Canadian national medallist and represented Canada at the 1998 Winter Olympics, where he placed 12th. His highest placement at the World Championships was 8th, in 1998. A member of Rideau Lakes FSC, he was coached by Doug Leigh and Robert Tebby at the Mariposa School of Skating.

Following his competitive retirement in 2001, Langdon coached for four years in Waterloo, Ontario and then skated on Royal Caribbean International cruise ships for Willy Bietak Productions. In 2008, he settled in Calgary, Alberta, and joined the staff at the Calalta Community Figure Skating Club.

Programs

Competitive highlights
GP: Champions Series / Grand Prix

References

 Slam!Sports Nagano Bio

Canadian male single skaters
Figure skaters at the 1998 Winter Olympics
Olympic figure skaters of Canada
1975 births
Living people
People from Smiths Falls
20th-century Canadian people
21st-century Canadian people